In Pakistan, a tehsil or (taluka) is an administrative sub-division of a District. Those are sub-divided into union councils. Here is a list of all the tehsil of Sindh ProvinceTahsil Tangwani,, Tahsil Kandh kot,, Tahsil Kashmore

Banbhore Division

Badin District

 Badin Tehsil
 Khoski Tehsil
 Matli Tehsil
 Shaheed Fazil Rahu Tehsil
 Talhar Tehsil
 Tando Bago Tehsil

Sujawal District

 Jati Tehsil
 Kharo Chan Tehsil
 Mirpur Bathoro Tehsil
 Shah Bandar Tehsil
 Sujawal Tehsil

Thatta District

 Ghorabari Tehsil
 Keti Bunder
 Mirpur Sakro Tehsil
 Thatta Tehsil

Hyderabad Division

Dadu District

 Dadu Tehsil
 Johi Tehsil
 Khairpur Nathan Shah Tehsil
 Mehar Tehsil

Hyderabad District

 Hyderabad City Tehsil
 Hyderabad Tehsil
 Latifabad Tehsil
 Qasimabad Tehsil

Jamshoro District
 Jamshoro Tehsil
 Sehwan Tehsil
 Kotri Tehsil
 Manjhand Tehsil
 Thana Bulla Khan Tehsil

Matiari District

 Hala Tehsil
 Matiari Tehsil
 Saeedabad Tehsil

Tando Allahyar District

 Chamber Tehsil
 Jhando Mari Tehsil
 Tando Allahyar Tehsil
 Nasarpur Tehsil

Tando Muhammad Khan District

 Bulri Shah Karim Tehsil
 Tando Ghulam Hyder Tehsil
 Tando Mohammad Khan Tehsil

Karachi Division

Karachi Central District

 Gulberg Town
 Liaquatabad Town
 New Karachi Town
 North Nazimabad Town
 Nazimabad

Karachi East District

 Gulshan Town
 Jamshed Town
 Ferozabad
 Gulshan-E-Iqbal
 Gulzar-E-Hijri

Karachi South District

 Lyari Town
 Saddar Town
 Aram Bagh
 Civil Line
 Garden

Karachi West District

 Orangi Town
 Manghopir
 Maripur
 Mominabad
 ittehad town
 baldia town

Korangi District

 Korangi Town
 Landhi Town
 Shah Faisal Town
 Model Colony

Malir District

 Bin Qasim Town
 Gadap Town
 Malir Town
 Jinnah
 Ibrahim Hyderi
 Murad Memon
 Shah Murad

Keamari District 

Keamari Town
Baldia Town
 S.I.T.E. Town
Karachi Fish Harbour

Larkana Division

Jacobabad District

 Garhi Khairo Tehsil
 Jacobabad Tehsil
 Thul Tehsil

Kashmore District

 Kandhkot Tehsil
 Kashmore Tehsil
 Tangwani Tehsil

Larkana District

 Bakrani Tehsil
 Dokri Tehsil
 Larkana Tehsil
 Ratodero Tehsil

Qambar-Shahdadkot District

 Mirokhan Tehsil
 Nasirabad Tehsil
 Qambar Tehsil
 Qubo Saeed Khan Tehsil
 Shahdadkot Tehsil
 Sijawal Junejo Tehsil
 Warah Tehsil

Shikarpur District

 Garhi Yasin Tehsil
 Khanpur Tehsil
 Lakhi Tehsil
 Shikarpur Tehsil

Mirpur Khas Division

Mirpur Khas District

 Digri Tehsil
 Jhuddo Tehsil
 Kot Ghulam Muhammad Tehsil
 Mirpur Khas Tehsil
 Shujabad Tehsil
 Sindhri Tehsil

Tharparkar District

 Chachro Tehsil
 Dahli Tehsil
 Diplo Tehsil
 Kaloi Tehsil
 Islamkot Tehsil
 Mithi Tehsil
 Nagarparkar Tehsil

Umerkot District

 Kunri Tehsil
 Pithoro Tehsil
 Samaro Tehsil
 Umerkot Tehsil

Sukkur Division

Ghotki District

 Daharki Tehsil
 Ghotki Tehsil
 Khangarh Tehsil (Khanpur)
 Mirpur Mathelo Tehsil
 Ubauro Tehsil

Khairpur Mirs District

 Faiz Ganj Tehsil
 Gambat Tehsil
 Khairpur Tehsil Mirs
 Kingri Tehsil
 Kot Diji Tehsil
 Nara Tehsil
 Sobho Dero Tehsil
 Thari Mirwah Tehsil

Sukkur District

 New Sukkur Tehsil
 Pano Aqil Tehsil
 Rohri Tehsil
 Salehpat Tehsil
 Sukkur Tehsil

Shaheed Benazir Abad Division

Naushahro Feroze District

 Bhiria Tehsil
 Kandioro Tehsil
 Mehrabpur Tehsil
 Moro Tehsil
 Naushahro Feroze Tehsil

Shaheed Benazir Abad District

 Daulatpur Tehsil (Qazi Ahmed)
 Daur Tehsil
 Nawabshah Tehsil
 Sakrand Tehsil

Sanghar District

 Jam Nawaz Ali Tehsil
 Khipro Tehsil
 Sanghar Tehsil
 Shahdadpur Tehsil
 Sinjhoro Tehsil
 Tando Adam Khan Tehsil

See also
 List of tehsils in Pakistan

Sukkur Tehsil
Pano Aqip Tehsil
Karachi Tehsil
Hyderabad Division
Mirpur Khās Division
Shaheed Banazir Abad Tehsil

Geography of Sindh